The discography of Sticky Fingaz, American hardcore rapper, record producer, actor, film director, film editor and writer, best known as a member of multi-platinum hardcore rap group Onyx, consists of 2 solo studio albums, 2 compilation albums, 3 soundtrack albums, 13 singles.

In 1991, Sticky Fingaz was discovered by Jam Master Jay of Run-D.M.C., who signed Onyx on his label JMJ Records provided that Sticky will be in the group. His signature lazy eye, raspy voice, and boundless energy brought attention to the group, and he became the front man. 
Onyx went on to release three top-selling albums before Sticky Fingaz began his solo career. As a part of Onyx, Sticky Fingaz was nominated as "Rap/Hip-Hop New Artist" on American Music Awards and won "Best Rap Album" on Soul Train Music Awards.

Studio albums

Mixtapes

Soundtrack albums
 August 22, 2000: The Original Kings Of Comedy - "Ghetto" by Sticky Fingaz (feat. Petey Pablo)
 July 14, 2009: A Day in the Life
 February 5, 2013: Caught On Tape

Singles

As lead artist

As lead artist (Free singles)
1995: "Ain't Like That" from New York Undercover (season 1 episode 17)
1995: "You Gets No Respect" from New York Undercover (season 1 episode 17)
1996: "Freestyle" from Tony Touch - #50 - Power Cypha (Featuring 50 MCs)
1998: "Freestyle" from Sway & King Tech - Wake Up Show Freestyles Vol. 4
1999: "Come On" by Sticky Fingaz from Green Lantern - It's Just Us And The Guns
1999: "I Want" by Sticky Fingaz, X1 from DJ Whoo Kid - Set It Off Part 4
1999: "Hard To Be A Thug" from DJ Whoo Kid - Niggas Don't Want It!, DJ Envy - Keep It Gangsta, DJ Green Lantern - Rookie Of The Year
1999: "Livin-N-Hell" (feat. X1 & Blaze) from Various Artists The Union presents: Organized Rhymes
2000: "The Price Of Air"
2000: "Freestyle" from DJ Whoo Kid -N- DJ Stretch Armstrong - Murda Mixtape Pt. 4
2001: "Freestyle" from DJ Whoo Kid -N- DJ Stretch Armstrong - Final Destination
2001: "Feel It" (feat. Dr. Dre) from DJ Whoo Kid - The Afterparty Part 11
2004: "Man Up" from Def Jam: Fight for NY (Soundtrack)
2006: "Get That Paper" (feat. Ayvee Verzonilla) from Crossover (Soundtrack)
2006: "You Know Me" from Breaking Point (Soundtrack)
2008: "One Way Or Another" (feat. Domination)
2008: "Some Of Us Got 2 Rob" (feat. Mr. D & Treach)
2009: "Da Next (feat. M Bars, Peeple$)
2009: "Dough Boys" (feat. Begetz) from Dough Boys (Soundtrack)
2009: "Eastwest Shyt" (feat. Knoc-Turn'al, Ms Roq, W-Ballz)
2009: "I Will Get Ya (Freestyle)"
2009: "Raised In The System" (a.k.a. "Just Tryin' To Get By") (feat. DCAP)
2009: "We Bring Gangsta To You"
2009: "You Don't Know Me" (a.k.a. "The Whole Damn New York")

Guest appearances
1993: "Livin' Loc'd" by Bo$$ (feat. Sticky Fingaz) from Bo$$ Born Gangstaz
1998: "QB Meets South Suicide" by Mobb Deep (feat. Sticky Fingaz & X1) from DJ Rampage - R2K, Mobb Deep The Dunn Language, The Infamous Archives
1998: "Strange Fruit" by Pete Rock (feat. Tragedy Khadafi, Cappadonna, Sticky Fingaz) from Pete Rock Soul Survivor
1998: "Live for Today" by M.A.D. Kutz (feat. Sticky Fingaz) from M.A.D. Kutz - Reelizm
1998: "Massive Heat" by Lord Tariq & Peter Gunz (feat. Kurupt & Sticky Fingaz) from Lord Tariq & Peter Gunz Make It Reign
1999: "Thugz Cry (Freestyle)" by Flesh-N-Bone, Wish Bone & Sticky Fingaz for 92.3
1999: "Buck' Em" by Snoop Dogg & Sticky Fingaz from Stretch Armstrong - Drugs
1999: "Buck 'Em" by Snoop Dogg (feat. Sticky Fingaz) from Snoop Dogg No Limit Top Dogg
1999: "New World Disorder" by Biohazard (feat. Sticky Fingaz, Christian Olde Wolbers & Igor Cavalera) from Biohazard New World Disorder
1999: "Full Clip (Remix)" by Gang Starr (feat. Sticky Fingaz) from Gang Starr - Full Clip Remix / Work Remix
1999: "Full Clip (RZA Mix)" by Gang Starr (feat. Sticky Fingaz) from RZA 7
2000: "Remember Me" by Eminem, RBX & Sticky Fingaz from DJ Evil Dee - Ha!! Ha!!
2000: "Ballers (Up In Here) (Universal Gangsters Platinum Remix)" by Ram Squad feat. Sticky Fingaz & Nelly from Ram Squad – Ballers (Up In Here) (Remixes & Instrumentals)
2000: "Look Out" by Caz (feat. Sticky Fingaz and Rappin' 4-Tay) from Caz - Thundadome
2000: "Love Of My Life" by De'Sean Superstar (feat. Sticky Fingaz)
2000: "Remember Me?"" by Eminem (feat. Sticky Fingaz & RBX) from Eminem The Marshall Mathers LP
2000: "Get It Up (Remix)" by Xzibit (feat. Sticky Fingaz, Method Man & Redman) from Xzibit Likwit Rhymes
2001: "Get Up (Remix)" by Sticky Fingaz, Method Man, Redman, Xzibit from DJ Whoo Kid & Stretch Armstrong - Unbreakable - Dirty Money 2001
2001: "What If I Was White" by Sticky Fingaz (feat. Eminem) from Various Artists Down To Earth Soundtrack
2001: "Money Talks" by Sticky Fingaz (feat. Raekwon) from Tony Touch - #64 - Rockin' Steadily
2001: "Get It Up (Remix)" by Sticky Fingaz (feat. Xzibit, Method Man & Redman) from Tony Touch - #64 - Rockin' Steadily
2001: "Freestyle" by Sticky Fingaz from DJ Whoo Kid & Stretch Armstrong - Final Destination
2001: "Thug Warz" by Fredro Starr (feat. The Outlawz and Sticky Fingaz) from Fredro Starr Firestarr
2001: "Soldierz" by Fredro Starr (feat. Sticky Fingaz & X1) from Fredro Starr Firestarr
2002: "See Thru My Eyes" by Johnny Blanco (feat. Sticky Fingaz)
2002: "The Rah Rah Nigga" by MC Eiht (feat. Sticky Fingaz) from MC Eiht - Underground Hero
2002: "Kill A Man" by Sticky Fingaz & Bizarre
2003: "All Out" by Fredro Starr (feat. Begetz, Sticky Fingaz & X-1) from Fredro Starr Don't Get Mad Get Money
2003: "Gangsta" by Concise (feat. Sticky Fingers And Checkmate) from Concise - F.A.M.E.
2003: "Do It Do It" by Sticky Fingaz & Method Man from Essman - Esspionage, Vol. 1
2004: "How I'm Livin'" by Double A & Sticky Fingaz from Doing Hard Time (OST)
2004: "Life" by G'Sharp, Omar Epps & Sticky Fingaz from BKNYCRecords Presents... The Get Back. Volume 1
2005: "Exclusive" by Sticky Fingaz from DJ Suprema One - Supremacy Volume 1
2006: "Back Again" by Basscamp & Sticky Fingaz from Basscamp & Sticky Fingaz - Southern Face
2006: "How High" by Ta Smallz (feat. Sticky Fingaz) from Ta Smallz - Having My Way
2006: "Money" by Sticky Fingers, 4Tay* & Caz from Layzie Bone & Mo Thugs Presents Various - 100% Pure Thug Tour
2007: "Get Lifted (Remix)" by The Whoridas (feat. Sticky Fingaz)
2008: "Cocaine Sex" by Nemesis Jackson (feat. Macy Gray & Sticky Fingers) from Nemesis Jackson - Snacs Vol. 1
2008: "Just Like You" by Skit Slam & The Beatnikz (feat. Cymarshall Law & Sticky Fingaz) from Skit Slam & The Beatnikz - A Blessing In Disguise
2009: "That's Still The Way" by Bishop Brigante (feat. MC Lyte & Sticky Fingaz) from Bishop Brigante - The Value Of A Hustle
2009: "Afraid Of Death" by C-Trizh (feat. Sticky Fingaz, Zeriouz) from C-Trizh - The Sampler
2010: "We Be G's" by M.O.P. (Feat. Sticky Fingaz & Busta Rhymes) from M.O.P. - Clear The Whole Projects (Mixtape)
2010: "Clappin!" by Mic Griffin (feat. Sticky Fingaz and Tash) from Mic Griffin - Gzup.com 
2011: "O.P.M. (Other Peoples Money)" by Angerville (feat. Johnny Rourke & Sticky Fingaz)
2011: "Sticky Fingaz Freestyle" by Sticky Fingaz from Annakin Slayd - Once More We Survive
2012: "Royalty" by DJ Lordjazz (feat. Doitall, Mr. Funke, J-Ro, Tash & Sticky Fingaz) from DJ Lordjazz - The Plain Dealer
2012: "Unleashed" by Jah Skillz (feat. Xzibit, Sticky Fingaz & Da 5 Footaz) from Jah Skillz - Who Is Diana Floss?
2012: "Dramitics" by Makem Pay (feat. Sticky Fingaz) from DJ Smooth Montana - Rise Of Power 3
2012: "Whoop Ass" by Oh No (feat. Sticky Fingaz) from  Oh No - Ohnomite
2013: "Fine Day" by Makem Pay (feat. Sticky Fingaz & Rah Bigalow)
2013: "Heavy With the Drop" by HMan (feat. Sticky Fingaz) from HMan - R.A.W (Rolling and Winning)
2013: "Europe Top Team - Unstoppable" by D.One (feat. Sticky Fingaz) from D.One - Europe Top Team: Unstoppable
2013: "Black Russians" by Славо (feat. Sticky Fingaz, Спрут) from Славо - ГРЕМУЧАЯ СМЕСЬ
2014: "Keep It Moving" by Pknuckle (feat. Sticky Fingaz & R-Mean) from Pknuckle - EPIC
2014: "Death Warrant" by Sadistik (feat. Sticky Fingaz & Tech N9Ne) from Sadistik Ultraviolet
2015: "Scum Bag" by Merkules (feat. Sticky Fingaz) from Merkules - Scars
2015: "True-n-Livin' Nightmares" by William Cooper (feat. Reef The Lost Cauze & Sticky Fingaz) from William Cooper - God's Will
2016: "Get 'Em Now" by Empire Cast (feat. Sticky Fingaz) from Empire Cast - Get 'Em Now - Single
2016: "Same G'z by Johnny Rourke (feat. Sticky Fingaz, JBRU, The K.I.D., P.Moody, 3D, Ghetto Child, Bobby Vintage)
2016: "I Can't Breathe" by Samuel L. Jackson, Sticky Fingaz, Talib Kweli, Mad Lion, Brother J & KRS-One
2016: "The 90's Are Back" by Snowgoons (feat O.C., DoItAll, UG, Sticky Fingaz, Dres, Nine, Sonny Seeza, Ras Kass & Psycho Les) from Snowgoons Goon Bap
2017: "Inferno" by Empire Cast (feat. Remy Ma & Sticky Fingaz) from Empire Cast - Inferno (feat. Remy Ma & Sticky Fingaz) - Single
2017: "Crime Lords" by Thirstin Howl The 3rd (feat. Sticky Fingaz) from Thirstin Howl The 3rd - Skillmatic
2018: "Time Of My Life" by Brand B (feat. Sticky Fingaz) from Brand B - The End Was Just The Beginning
2018: "Pass the Mic" by D.Craze the Destroyer (feat. Gorilla Voltage, Bizzy Bone, Chino XL & Sticky Fingaz) from D.Craze the Destroyer  - The Great Unknown
2018: "I'm a G (Remix)" by Mr. ESQ (feat. Merkules, Sticky Fingaz & Method Man) from Mr. ESQ Kriminal Ties - EP
2018: "All Handz on Deck" by Optimystic (feat. Sticky Fingaz & Rockness Monsta) from Optimystic Salty Waterz

Music videos
2000: "Get It Up" | Directed by Marc Klasfeld
2003: "Can't Call It" | Directed by George Yamamoto
2008: "Debo The Game" | Directed by Kevin Johnson
2011: "The Whole Damn New York" (a.k.a. "You Don't Know Me") | Directed by Sticky Fingaz & Myster DL
2012: "Rap Starr" (feat. Heidi Marie) | Directed by Sticky Fingaz
2016: "Celebrate Life" (feat. Just Gii) | Directed by Teddy Knock and Sticky Fingaz
2017: "Made Me" (feat. Cassidy) | Directed by Sticky Fingaz
2018: "Change My Life" | Directed by Sticky Fingaz
2018: "New York Niguhz In Hollywood" (feat. N.O.R.E.) | Directed by Sticky Fingaz
2018: "Put Your Fingaz Up" | Directed by Sticky Fingaz
2018: "S.T.F.U." (feat. Fredro Starr, M.O.P.) | Directed by Sticky Fingaz
2018: "S.T.F.U." (feat. Fredro Starr, M.O.P.) (Clean Version) | Directed by Sticky Fingaz
2018: "Maybe I'm A Hater" | Directed by Sticky Fingaz

References

External links
 Sticky Fingaz at Discogs

Hip hop discographies
Discographies of American artists